Buck Run is a  long 2nd order tributary to Buffalo Creek in Washington County, Pennsylvania.

Course
Buck Run rises about 0.5 miles south of Donley, Pennsylvania, in Washington County and then flows north-northwest to join Buffalo Creek at Acheson.

Watershed
Buck Run drains  of area, receives about 40.1 in/year of precipitation, has a wetness index of 310.59, and is about 67% forested.

See also
List of Pennsylvania Rivers

References

Rivers of Pennsylvania
Rivers of Washington County, Pennsylvania